Thomas Dunlop may refer to:

Sir Thomas Dunlop, 1st Baronet (1855–1938), Scottish businessman
Thomas Dunlop (footballer) (1872–?), Scottish footballer of the 1890s
Thomas Dunlop Galbraith, 1st Baron Strathclyde, Scottish politician
Sir Thomas Dunlop, 2nd Baronet (1881–1963)
Sir Thomas Dunlop, 3rd Baronet (1912–1999), Scottish businessman
Sir Thomas Dunlop, 4th Baronet (born 1951) 
Thomas Dunlop (Australian politician) (1880–1956), member of the Queensland Legislative Assembly